Guangzhou railway station serves the city of Guangzhou. It sits on the high speed Guangshen railway just west of Guangzhou East. CRH trains from Guangzhou serves Shenzhen six times daily.

Services from this station include trains to Beijing (Jingguang railway) and Lhasa.  It is served by the Guangzhou Metro on Line 2 and Line 5.

History 

The first central railway station in Guangzhou, known as East Canton Railway Station or Dashatou railway station, was built in 1911 as the northern terminus of the Kowloon-Canton Railway.

In the 1950s, the Guangdong provincial government saw the need for a new central train station in Guangzhou to meet the increasing demands for rail travels. Construction began in 1960, but it was not completed until 1974 due to interruptions by the Great Leap Forward and the Cultural Revolution.

On April 4, 1979, with the normalisation of relations with Hong Kong, the through-train service that was suspended for over twenty-five years was resumed. Through-train services were moved to Guangzhou East in 1996.

Rail services 

 Beijing–Guangzhou Railway
 Guangzhou–Shenzhen Railway
 Guangzhou–Maoming Railway
 Guangzhou–Foshan–Zhaoqing Intercity Railway

Metro services 
An interchange station of Line 2 and Line 5 of the Guangzhou Metro. It is located at the underground of the west square of Guangzhou Railway Station, located at the junction of Ring Road West ( and Renmin Road North in Yuexiu District. It started operations on December 29, 2002, (Line 2) and December 2009 (Line 5) respectively. Its area is about 10000 square metres and it is the second largest metro station in Guangzhou.

References

External links 
 Guangzhou Train Schedule and Rail Journey Guide

Railway stations in China opened in 1974
Railway stations in Guangzhou
Guangzhou Metro stations in Yuexiu District
Stations on the Guangzhou–Shenzhen Railway